Tarata Canton is one of the cantons of the Tarata Municipality, the first municipal section of the Esteban Arce Province in the Cochabamba Department in central Bolivia. Its seat is the town of Tarata (3,323 inhabitants, census 2001).

References 
 www.ine.gov.bo

External links
 Population data and map of Tarata Municipality

Cantons of Cochabamba Department
Cantons of Bolivia